Macrocoma zarudnii is a species of leaf beetle found in Iran and the United Arab Emirates, described by  in 1985.

References

zarudnii
Beetles of Asia
Insects of Iran
Insects of the Arabian Peninsula
Beetles described in 1985